Kilberry is a village in County Kildare, Ireland. It is located on the R417 regional road in the valley of the River Barrow 4 km north of Athy. Rheban Castle lies to the west. At the time of the 2016 census, the village had a population of 400 people.

See also
 List of towns and villages in Ireland
 List of abbeys and priories in Ireland (County Kildare)

References

Towns and villages in County Kildare
Church of Ireland parishes in the Republic of Ireland